Omiodes giffardi is a moth of the family Crambidae. It was described by Otto Herman Swezey in 1921 and is endemic to the island of Hawaii.

The larvae feed on Isachne distichophylla.

External links

Moths described in 1921
giffardi
Endemic moths of Hawaii